William Ewart Berry, 1st Viscount Camrose DL (23 June 1879 – 15 June 1954) was a British peer and newspaper publisher.

Life and career
Berry was born in Merthyr Tydfil in Wales, the second of three sons of Mary Ann (Rowe) and John Mathias Berry. Berry started his working life as a journalist and established his own paper, Advertising World, in 1901. Berry made his fortune with the publication of the First World War magazine The War Illustrated, which at its peak had a circulation of 750,000. In partnership with his younger brother, Gomer Berry, 1st Viscount Kemsley (the elder brother was Seymour Berry, 1st Baron Buckland), he purchased The Sunday Times in 1915 and was its editor-in-chief until 1937. In 1919 the pair also purchased the Financial Times.

In 1924 the Berry brothers and Sir Edward Iliffe set up Allied Newspapers and purchased the Daily Dispatch, the Manchester Evening Chronicle, the Sunday Chronicle, the Sunday News, and the Sunday Graphic, as well as a string of other newspapers across the country. In Cardiff they merged four newspapers into the Western Mail. In 1927 they purchased The Daily Telegraph from the 2nd Harry Levy-Lawson, 1st Viscount Burnham, with William Berry becoming its editor-in-chief. In 1937 they purchased its rival, The Morning Post.

In 1926, the Berry brothers/Allied Newspapers purchased Amalgamated Press (AP), which had been started by Alfred Harmsworth, 1st Viscount Northcliffe, in 1901 (Harmsworth had died in 1922).

Berry bought out his partners in 1937 and amalgamated The Morning Post with The Daily Telegraph, with himself as chairman and editor-in-chief. His sons Seymour, the 2nd Viscount, and subsequently Michael, continued to run the newspaper until 1986; in addition, Seymour was Vice Chairman of Amalgamated Press from 1942 to 1959 (when AP was acquired by the Mirror Group).

He provided financial assistance to Sir Winston Churchill after the Second World War. He and ten other wealthy well-wishers each donated £5,000 to the Churchills, allowing them to keep their home, Chartwell, on the condition that it would be presented to the nation upon their deaths.

Honours
Berry was created a baronet in the 1921 Birthday Honours. He was raised to the peerage as Baron Camrose, of Long Cross in the County of Surrey, on 19 June 1929, and advanced to Viscount Camrose, of Hackwood Park in the County of Southampton, on 20 January 1941.

Family
Berry married Mary Agnes Corns in 1905. They had eight children together:

 Hon. Mary Cecilia Berry (1906 – 24 June 1996)
 (John) Seymour Berry, 2nd Viscount Camrose (12 July 1909 – 15 February 1995)
 (William) Michael Berry, Baron Hartwell, 3rd Viscount Camrose (18 May 1911 – 3 April 2001)
 Hon. Sheila Berry (1913–1992)
 Hon. Molly Patricia Berry (1915 – 31 August 1995)
 Hon. Rodney Mathias Berry (29 April 1917 – 10 March 1963)
 Lt Col. Hon. Julian Berry (24 May 1920 – 1988)
 Hon. Diana Phyllis Berry (1924 – March 1995)

Berry died in 1954 and was succeeded in the viscountcy, barony and baronetcy by his eldest son, Seymour.

Berry's great-grandson is actor Joshua Sasse.

Arms

References

References
Biography, Oxford Dictionary of National Biography
 The House the Berrys Built by Duff Hart-Davis. Concerns the history of the Daily Telegraph from its inception to 1990.
 William Camrose: Giant of Fleet Street by his son Lord Hartwell. Illustrated biography with black-and-white photographic plates and includes an index.
 "William Berry (Lord Camrose) 1879 – 1954," Cynon Culture

External links

Berry, William
Welsh male journalists
20th-century Welsh businesspeople
British newspaper editors
British newspaper publishers (people)
British magazine founders
Conservative Party (UK) hereditary peers
Deputy Lieutenants of Hampshire
1
1879 births
1954 deaths
William Berry
Barons created by George V
Viscounts created by George VI